Antonio María Sáez Aguado (born 1955) is a Spanish politician and doctor. He is a member of the People's Party. He was the minister of health of the Junta of Castile and León from 2015 to 2019. He was appointed health minister of the Junta of Castile and León on 27 June 2011 until July 2019. He held positions of general director of public health and managing director of the regional management of health of Castile and León.

Biography
Antonio was born in Palencia, Spain on 1955. He studied at the University of Valladolid. He graduated in medicine and surgery from the University of Valladolid in 1980. He is a university specialist in hospital management since 1993. He was also an associate professor at the faculty of psychology at the University of Salamanca.

References 

1955 births
Living people
20th-century Spanish politicians
21st-century Spanish politicians
People's Party (Spain) politicians
University of Valladolid alumni
People from Palencia